Ferdinandea croesus is a species of syrphid fly, in the family Syrphidae.

References

External links

 

Diptera of North America
Hoverflies of North America
Eristalinae
Articles created by Qbugbot
Taxa named by Carl Robert Osten-Sacken
Insects described in 1877